Eze Chika Philip (born 24 December 1993) is a footballer from Nigeria who last played for Southern Myanmar F.C. of the Myanmar National League.

Myanmar
Without a club after assisting Horizon F.C. in their quest for promotion in 2015, Philip was picked up by Southern Myanmar F.C. in the hopes of revivifying their lineup for the second half of the 2016 Myanmar National League.

References

Nigerian footballers
Association football forwards
1993 births
Living people
Nigerian expatriate footballers
Expatriate footballers in Myanmar
Myanmar National League players
Southern Myanmar F.C. players